Awais Qadir Shah is a Pakistani politician who had been a Member of the Provincial Assembly of Sindh, from May 2013 to May 2018.

Early life and education
He was born on 12 October 1977 in Sukkur.

He has a degree in Bachelor of Engineering from Civil Mehran University in Jamshoro.

Political career

He was elected to the Provincial Assembly of Sindh as a candidate of Pakistan Peoples Party (PPP) from Constituency PS-4 SUKKUR-III (OLD SUKKUR-IV) in 2013 Pakistani general election.

He was re-elected to Provincial Assembly of Sindh as a candidate of PPP from Constituency PS-23 (Sukkur-II) in 2018 Pakistani general election.

On 15 October 2018, he was inducted into the provincial Sindh cabinet of Chief Minister Syed Murad Ali Shah and was appointed as Provincial Minister of Sindh for transport and mass transit.

References

Living people
Sindh MPAs 2013–2018
1977 births
Pakistan People's Party MPAs (Sindh)
Sindh MPAs 2018–2023